Ostomachion, also known as loculus Archimedius or syntomachion, is a mathematical treatise attributed to Archimedes. This work has survived fragmentarily in an Arabic version and a copy, the Archimedes Palimpsest, of the original ancient Greek text made in Byzantine times.

The word Ostomachion has as its roots in the Greek Ὀστομάχιον, which means "bone-fight", from ὀστέον (osteon), "bone" and μάχη (mache), "fight, battle, combat". The manuscripts refer to the word as "Stomachion", an apparent corruption of the original Greek. Ausonius gives us the correct name "Ostomachion" (quod Graeci ostomachion vocavere, "which the Greeks called ostomachion").

The Ostomachion which he describes was a puzzle similar to tangrams and was played perhaps by several persons with pieces made of bone. It is not known which is older, Archimedes' geometrical investigation of the figure, or the game. Victorinus, Bassus Ennodius and Lucretius have talked about the game too.

Game
The game is a 14-piece dissection puzzle forming a square. One form of play to which classical texts attest is the creation of different objects, animals, plants etc. by rearranging the pieces: an elephant, a tree, a barking dog, a ship, a sword, a tower etc. Another suggestion is that it exercised and developed memory skills in the young. James Gow, in his Short History of Greek Mathematics (1884), footnotes that the purpose was to put the pieces back in their box, and this was also a view expressed by W. W. Rouse Ball in some intermediate editions of Mathematical Essays and Recreations, but edited out from 1939.

The number of different ways to arrange the parts of the Stomachions within a square were determined to be 17,152 by Fan Chung, Persi Diaconis, Susan P. Holmes, and Ronald Graham, and confirmed by a computer search by William H. Cutler.
However, this count has been disputed because surviving images of the puzzle show it in a rectangle, not a square, and rotations or reflections of pieces may not have been allowed.

References

Further reading
 J. L. Heiberg, Archimedis opera omnia, vol. 2, pp. 420 ff., Leipzig: Teubner 1881
 Reviel Netz & William Noel, The Archimedes Codex (Weidenfeld & Nicolson, 2007)
 J. Väterlein, Roma ludens (Heuremata - Studien zu Literatur, Sprachen und Kultur der Antike, Bd. 5), Amsterdam: Verlag B. R. Grüner bv 1976

External links

Heinrich Suter, Loculus
James Gow, Short History
W. W. R. Ball, Recreations and Essays
The Ostomachion at the Bibliotheca Augustana
Ostomachion, a Graeco-Roman puzzle
Professor Chris Rorres
Kolata, Gina. "In Archimedes' Puzzle, a New Eureka Moment." The New York Times. December 14, 2003
A tour of Archimedes' Stomachion, by Fan Chung and Ronald Graham.
Ostomachion and others tangram Play with 38 Tangram games online: more than 7,300 shapes proposed by the program.

Ancient Greek mathematical works
Puzzles
Tiling puzzles
Works by Archimedes
Geometric dissection